The region known as Hispanic America (in Spanish called Hispanoamérica or América Hispana) and historically as Spanish America (América Española) is the portion of the Americas comprising the Spanish-speaking countries of North America and South America. In all of these countries, Spanish is the main language, sometimes sharing official status with one or more indigenous languages (such as Guaraní, Quechua, Aymara, or Mayan) or English (in Puerto Rico), and Roman Catholicism is the predominant religion.

Hispanic America is sometimes grouped together with Brazil under the term "Ibero-America", meaning those countries in the Americas with cultural roots in the Iberian Peninsula. Hispanic America also contrasts with Latin America, which includes not only Hispanic America, but also Brazil (the former Portuguese America) and the former French colonies in the Western Hemisphere (areas that are now in either the United States or Canada are usually excluded).

History
The Spanish conquest of the Americas began in 1492, and ultimately was part of a larger historical process of world discovery, through which various European powers colonized a considerable amount of territory and peoples in the Americas, Asia, and Africa between the 15th and 20th centuries. Hispanic America became the main part of the vast Spanish Empire. Napoleon's intervention in Spain in 1808 and the consequent chaos initiated the dismemberment of the Spanish Empire, as the Hispanic American territories began their struggle for emancipation. By 1830, the only remaining Spanish American territories were the islands of Cuba and Puerto Rico, until the 1898 Spanish–American War.

The 26th of July Movement, led by Fidel Castro, seized power in Cuba on 1 January 1959, overthrowing Fulgencio Batista's pro-US government. Castro nationalized Cuba's fruit resources, driving the United Fruit Company out, and his purchase of oil from the USSR led to a deterioration of relations with the US, leading to the failed 1961 Bay of Pigs Invasion by Cuban exiles, and in 1962 the Cuban Missile Crisis almost sparked World War III. Castro's revolution was only the first of its kind in Hispanic America. Leftist governments rose to power across the region, so the United States resorted to backing coups, such as the 1954 overthrow of the popular Jacobo Arbenz Guzman in Guatemala and the ouster of Juan Bosch in 1965 in the Dominican Republic, the latter of which led to the Dominican Civil War and the US occupation of the republic that year. The United States supported coups that installed dictators in Chile, Uruguay, and other countries, and they set up the School of the Americas to train future dictators like Leopoldo Galtieri of Argentina and Manuel Noriega of Panama. Some dictators' rules led to civil wars, such as the Nicaraguan Civil War, Salvadoran Civil War, and Guatemalan Civil War in the 1970s-1990s, and the United States backed governments that used death squads to massacre villagers and priests accused of siding with leftists. These civil wars would end with the end of the Cold War, resulting in the communist guerrillas becoming legal political parties, and many of them would proceed to rule over the country, such as the Sandinistas of Nicaragua and FMLN of El Salvador.

Demographics

Countries

Largest cities

Ethnology

The population of the Hispanic America is made up of the descendants of three large ethnic groups and their combinations.

• The Indigenous peoples of the Americas, descendants of Incas, Aztecs, Mayan and others.

• Those of European ancestry, mainly Spanish, and Italian; less, German, and French.

• Those of African ancestry, mainly of West and Central African descent.

Unlike in the United States, there were no anti-miscegenation policies in Latin America. Though still a racially stratified society there were no significant barriers to gene flow between the three populations. As a result, admixture profiles are a reflection of the colonial populations of Africans, Europeans and Amerindians. The pattern is also sex biased in that the African and Amerindian maternal lines are found in significantly higher proportions than African or Amerindian Y chromosomal lines. This is an indication that the primary mating pattern was that of European males with Amerindian or African females. According to the study more than half the White populations of the Latin American countries studied have some degree of either Native American or African admixture (MtDNA or Y chromosome). 
In countries such as Chile and Colombia almost the entire white population was shown to have some non-European admixture.

Frank Moya Pons, a Dominican historian documented that Spanish colonists intermarried with Taíno women, and, over time, these mestizo descendants intermarried with Africans, creating a tri-racial Creole culture. 1514 census records reveal that 40% of Spanish men in the colony of Santo Domingo had Taíno wives. A 2002 study conducted in Puerto Rico suggests that over 61% of the population possess Amerindian mtDNA.

The most common combinations are:

• Mestizos, those of mixed European and Amerindian ancestry.

And

• Mulattoes, people of mixed African and European ancestry.

Languages

Spanish is the official language in most Hispanic American countries, and it is spoken by the vast majority of the population. Native American languages are widely spoken in Chile, Peru, Guatemala, Bolivia, Paraguay and Mexico, and, to a lesser degree, in Panama, Ecuador, Colombia,and Venezuela. In some Hispanic American countries, the population of speakers of indigenous languages tends to be very small or even non-existent (e.g. Uruguay). Mexico contains the largest variety of indigenous languages; there, the most spoken native language is Nahuatl.

In Peru, Quechua is an official language, alongside Spanish and any other indigenous language in the areas where they predominate. In Ecuador, while holding no official status, the closely related Quichua is a recognized language of the indigenous people under the country's constitution; however, it is only spoken by a few groups in the country's highlands. In Bolivia, Aymara, Quechua and Guaraní hold official status alongside Spanish. Guaraní, along with Spanish, is an official language of Paraguay, and is spoken by a majority of the population (who are, for the most part, bilingual), and it is co-official with Spanish in the Argentine province of Corrientes. In Nicaragua, Spanish is the official language, but on the country's Caribbean coast English and indigenous languages such as Miskito, Sumo, and Rama also hold official status. Colombia recognizes all indigenous languages spoken within its territory as official, though fewer than 1% of its population are native speakers of these languages. Nahuatl is one of the 62 native languages spoken by indigenous people in Mexico, which are officially recognized by the government as "national languages" along with Spanish.

Other European languages spoken in Hispanic America include: English, by some groups in Puerto Rico and descendants of British settlers in Argentina and Chile; German, in southern Chile and portions of Argentina, Venezuela, and Paraguay; Italian, in Argentina, Venezuela, and Uruguay; Ukrainian, Polish, and Russian in Argentina; and Welsh, in southern Argentina.
Yiddish and Hebrew can be heard around Buenos Aires. Non-European or Asian languages include Japanese in Peru, Bolivia, and Paraguay; Korean in Argentina and Paraguay; Arabic in Argentina, Colombia, Venezuela, and Chile; and Chinese throughout South America.

In several nations, especially in the Caribbean region, creole languages are spoken. Creole languages of mainland Latin America, similarly, are derived from European languages and various African tongues.

The Garifuna language is spoken along the Caribbean coast in Honduras, Guatemala, Nicaragua and Belize mostly by the Garifuna people a mixed race Zambo people who were the result of mixing between Indigenous Caribbeans and escaped Black slaves. Primarily an Arawakan language, it has influences from Caribbean and European languages.

Culture

Cuisine
Hispanic cuisine as the term is applied in the Western Hemisphere, is a misnomer. What is  usually considered Hispanic cuisine in the United States is mostly Mexican and Central American cuisine. Mexican cuisine is composed of mainly indigenous—Aztec and Mayan—and Spanish influences.

Mexican cuisine is considered intangible cultural heritage by UNESCO and can be found all over the United States.

In the United States, with its growing Hispanic population, food staples from Mexican cuisine and the cuisine from other Hispanic countries have become widely available. Over the years, the blending of these cuisines has produced unique American forms such as Tex-Mex cuisine. This cuisine, which originated in Texas, is based on maize products, heavily spiced ground beef, cheese and tomato sauces with chilies. This cuisine is widely available not just in the United States but across other countries, where American exports are found. In Florida, Cuban food is widely available. All of these Hispanic foods in the United States have evolved in character as they have been commercially americanized by large restaurant chains and food companies.

The cuisine of Spain has many regional varieties, with Mediterranean flavors based on  olive oil, garlic, and tomatoes and due to its long Atlantic and Mediterranean coastlines, has been graced with a great variety and availability of seafood.  In the inland communities of Spain, there is a long tradition of cured meat of different kinds, in addition to an abundance of dishes such as roasts and stews, based on beef, pork, lamb, and poultry. The European and Arab heritage of Spain is reflected in its food, along with cosmopolitan influences beginning in the many new ingredients brought in from the New World since the 16th century, e.g. tomatoes, potatoes, or chocolate, and the more modern tastes introduced from Europe since the 19th century, especially through French and Italian dishes. It is only in the last ten years  that Hispanic American dishes have been introduced in Spain. In the United States and Canada, the number of Hispanic restaurants has become a growing trend, following the tapas-style restaurants fashion that first appeared in North America in the 1990s.

Cuban, Dominican, and Puerto Rican cuisines, on the other hand, tend to use a lot of pork and can depend heavily on starchy root vegetables, plantain, and rice. The most prominent influences on their Spanish culinary traditions were introduced by African slaves, and to a lesser degree, French influence from Haiti and later Chinese immigrants. The use of spicy chile peppers of varying degrees of strength used as flavour enhancers in Mexican tradition is practically unknown in traditional Spanish–Caribbean dishes. The cuisine of Haiti, a country with a Francophone majority, is very similar to its regional neighbors in terms of influences and ingredients used.

The Argentine diet is heavily influenced by the country's position as one of the world's largest beef and wine producers, and by the impact that European immigration had on its national culture. Grilled meats are a staple of most meals as are pastas, potatoes, rice, paella and a variety of vegetables (Argentina is a huge exporter of agricultural products). Italian influence is also seen in the form of pizza and ice cream, both of which are integral components of national cuisine.
 
Uruguayan cuisine is similar to that of Argentina, though seafood is much more dominant in this coastal nation. As another one of the world's largest producers, wine is as much a staple drink to Uruguayans as beer is to Germans.

In Colombia, Ecuador, Peru and Chile, potato dishes are typical since the potato is originally from this region. Beef and chicken are common sources of meat. In the Highlands is the cuy, a South American name for guinea pig, a common meat. Given the coastal location, both countries have extensive fishing fleets, which provide a wealth of seafood options, including the signature South American dish, ceviche. While potato is an important ingredient in the Highlands, Rice is the main side dish on the coast.

This diversity in staples and cuisine is also evident in the differing regional cuisines within the national borders of the individual countries.

Symbols

Flag

While relatively unknown, there is a flag representing the countries of Spanish America, its people, history and shared cultural legacy.

It was created in October 1933 by Ángel Camblor, captain of the Uruguayan army. It was adopted by all the states of Spanish America during the Pan-American Conference of the same year in Montevideo, Uruguay.

The white background stands for peace, the Inti sun god of Inca mythology symbolizes the light shining on the Americas, and the three crosses represent Christopher Columbus' caravels, the Niña, Pinta, and Santa María, used in his first voyage from Spain to the New World in 1492. The deep lilac color of the crosses evokes the color of the lion on the coat of arms of the medieval Crown of Castile.

Religion
The Spanish and the Portuguese took the Roman Catholic faith to their colonies in the Americas, Africa, and Asia; Roman Catholicism remains the predominant religion amongst most Hispanic Americans. Membership in Protestant denominations is increasing, particularly in Guatemala, El Salvador, Honduras, Nicaragua, Puerto Rico and other countries. In particular, Pentecostalism has experienced massive growth. This movement is increasingly attracting Latin America's middle classes. Anglicanism also has a long and growing presence in Latin America.

See also

References

Country classifications
Hispanidad
Latin America
Ibero-America
Regions of the Americas
Spanish language in the Americas